The Multinational CIMIC Group is a multinational civil-military co-operation unit of NATO, led and supported by the Italian Army. Based in Motta di Livenza in Veneto the unit consists of armed forces personnel from Italy, Greece, Hungary, Portugal, Romania and Slovenia. The unit is administratively assigned to the Italian army's Tactical Intelligence Brigade and affiliated with NATO's Supreme Headquarters Allied Powers in Europe and consists of a multinational headquarters, a multinational Command and Logistic Support Company, an Italian National Support Command, and CIMIC Battalion with personnel from the Italian Armed Forces.

Current structure 
As of 2022 the Multinational CIMIC Group consists of:

  Group Command, in Motta di Livenza
 Multinational Command (Operational tasks)
 National Support Command (Administrative tasks)
 Multinational Command and Logistic Support Company
 Garrison Support Unit
 CIMIC Battalion
 1st CIMIC Company
 2nd CIMIC Company
 3rd CIMIC Company
 4th CIMIC Company
 5th CIMIC Company

The Command and Logistic Support Company fields the following platoons: C3 Platoon, Transport and Materiel Platoon, Medical Platoon, and Commissariat Platoon.

External links
Multinational CIMIC Group Website
Italian Army Website: Multinational CIMIC Group

References

Engineer Regiments of Italy
Military units and formations of NATO